The former Province of Southern Finland in Finland was divided into six regions, 16 sub-regions, and 88 municipalities.

Regions
South Karelia (Etelä-Karjala/Södra Karelen)
Päijät-Häme (Päijät-Häme/Päijänne Tavastland)
Kanta-Häme (Kanta-Häme/Egentliga Tavastland)
Uusimaa (Uusimaa/Nyland)
Kymenlaakso (Kymenlaakso/Kymmenedalen)

South Karelia Region

Lappeenranta Sub-region
Joutseno
Lappeenranta (Villmansstrand)
Western Saimaa
Lemi (Klemis)
Luumäki
Savitaipale
Suomenniemi
Taipalsaari
Ylämaa
Imatra Sub-region
Imatra
Rautjärvi
Ruokolahti (Ruokolax)
Kärkikunnat Sub-region
Parikkala
Saari
Uukuniemi

Päijät-Häme Region

Lahti Sub-region
Artjärvi (Artsjö)
Asikkala
Hollola
Hämeenkoski
Kärkölä
Lahti (Lahtis)
Nastola
Orimattila
Padasjoki
Heinola Sub-region
Hartola (Gustav Adolfs)
Heinola
Sysmä

Kanta-Häme Region

Hämeenlinna Sub-region
Hattula
Hauho
Hämeenlinna (Tavastehus)
Janakkala
Kalvola
Lammi (Lampis)
Renko
Tuulos
Riihimäki Sub-region
Hausjärvi
Loppi (Loppis)
Riihimäki
Forssa Sub-region
Forssa
Humppila
Jokioinen (Jockis)
Tammela
Ypäjä

Uusimaa Region

Helsinki Sub-region
Espoo (Esbo)
Helsinki (Helsingfors)
Vantaa (Vanda)
Hyvinkää (Hyvinge)
Järvenpää (Träskända)
Kauniainen (Grankulla)
Kerava (Kervo)
Kirkkonummi (Kyrkslätt)
Mäntsälä
Nurmijärvi
Pornainen (Borgnäs)
Siuntio (Sjundeå)
Tuusula (Tusby)
Lohja Sub-region
Karjalohja (Karislojo)
Karkkila (Högfors)
Lohja (Lojo)
Nummi-Pusula
Sammatti
Vihti (Vichtis)
Porvoo Sub-region
Askola
Myrskylä (Mörskom)
Pukkila
Porvoo (Borgå)
Sipoo (Sibbo)
Loviisa Sub-region
Lapinjärvi (Lappträsk)
Liljendal
Loviisa (Lovisa)
Pernå (Pernaja)
Ruotsinpyhtää (Strömfors)
Ekenäs Sub-region
Hanko (Hangö)
Ingå (Inkoo)
Karis (Karjaa)
Pohja (Pojo)
Ekenäs (Tammisaari)

Kymenlaakso Region

Kouvola Sub-region
Elimäki (Elimä)
Iitti (Itis)
Jaala
Kouvola
Kuusankoski
Anjalankoski
Valkeala
Kotka-Hamina Sub-region
Hamina (Fredrikshamn)
Kotka
Miehikkälä
Pyhtää (Pyttis)
Virolahti (Vederlax)

See also
Municipalities of South Karelia
Municipalities of Päijät-Häme
Municipalities of Kanta-Häme
Municipalities of Uusimaa
Municipalities of Kymenlaakso

Southern Finland Province